Jesse William Mashburn (born February 14, 1933) is an American former athlete, winner of gold medal in 4 × 400 m relay at the 1956 Summer Olympics. He is also a homebuilder.

At the 1955 Pan-American Games, Mashburn was third in 400 m and won a gold medal as a member of American 4 × 400 m relay team.

At the Melbourne Olympics, Mashburn ran the third leg in the gold medal winning American 4 × 400 m relay team.

References

External links
J W Mashburn Homes

1933 births
Living people
People from Seminole, Oklahoma
American male sprinters
Track and field athletes from Oklahoma
Athletes (track and field) at the 1955 Pan American Games
Athletes (track and field) at the 1956 Summer Olympics
Olympic gold medalists for the United States in track and field
Medalists at the 1956 Summer Olympics
Pan American Games medalists in athletics (track and field)
Pan American Games gold medalists for the United States
Pan American Games bronze medalists for the United States
Medalists at the 1955 Pan American Games